Backstop may refer to:

Sport
 Backstop (baseball), a screen behind a field's home plate
Catcher, a defensive baseball position behind home plate
 Backstop, a player position in rounders similar to the catcher in baseball
 Backstop, in the glossary of rowing terms
 Backstop (shooting), a construction of sand or other materials used to stop and contain bullets, for example at shooting ranges

Fictional characters
 Back-Stop (G.I. Joe), a fictional character in the G.I. Joe universe
 Backstop (Transformers), a fictional character in the Transformers: Cybertron animated series and toy line

Other uses
 Backstop (geology), a tectonic feature
 Backstopping markets, a financial term related to the use of the Greenspan put 
Backstop resources, an economic theory
 Operation Backstop, United Nations Protection Force (UNPROFOR) military plan during the Croatian War of Independence
 Irish backstop, a familiar name for the concept of a temporary EU/UK common customs area, proposed in the (failed) 2018 draft Brexit withdrawal agreement

See also
 Buffer stop or bumper, a railway device